The 2013 Women's Futsal World Tournament was the fourth edition of the Women's Futsal World Tournament, the premier world championship for women's national futsal teams. The competition was to be hosted in San Cristóbal, Táchira, Venezuela, but due to logistic problems, the competition was moved to Ciudad Real and Alcázar de San Juan, in Spain.

Venues

Group stage

Group A

Group B

Play-off round

Final ranking

Note - Malaysia sent their B team as the A team was taking part in the Southeast Asian Games in Myanmar at the same time.

References

External links
Spanish FA website

Women World Tournament
Women's Futsal World Tournament
Women
International futsal competitions hosted by Spain